The women's 800 metre freestyle event at the 11th FINA World Swimming Championships (25m) took place 13 December 2012 at the Sinan Erdem Dome.  This event was a timed-final where each swimmer swam just once. The top 8 seeded swimmers swam in the evening, and the remaining swimmers swam in the morning session.

Records
Prior to this competition, the existing world and championship records were as follows.

No new records were set during this competition.

Results

External links
 2012 FINA World Swimming Championships (25 m): Women's 800 metre freestyle (final rankings), from OmegaTiming.com.

Freestyle 0800 metre, women's
World Short Course Swimming Championships
2012 in women's swimming